Chemistry is the third studio album by English-Irish girl group Girls Aloud. It was released in the United Kingdom on 5 December 2005 by Polydor Records. After the success of What Will the Neighbours Say?, the album was again entirely produced by Brian Higgins and his production team Xenomania. Chemistry is a loose concept album which details celebrity lifestyle and "what it's like to be a twentysomething girl in London." A number of the songs avert the verse-chorus form typical of pop music.

Chemistry was universally acclaimed by a number of contemporary music critics upon its release. Despite a relatively low chart position (peaking at 11, the lowest charting release by the group), the album yielded four top ten singles and was certified platinum in the United Kingdom and Ireland, selling over 390,000 copies. The album was followed by the Chemistry Tour, which had Girls Aloud performing in arenas for the first time.

Conception
After the success of What Will the Neighbours Say?, which was solely produced by Brian Higgins and Xenomania, the production team was asked to create Girls Aloud's third studio album. Chemistry was entirely produced and written by Xenomania, apart from a cover of Dee C. Lee's "See the Day." The album was recorded in 2005, following the What Will the Neighbours Say...? Tour. Parts of the process were shown in the fly on the wall documentary Girls Aloud: Home Truths.

Music

Style and lyrics
Chemistry explores a more innovative approach to pop music, straying from the typical verse-chorus form present in most songs. Alexis Petridis of The Guardian wrote that Chemistry is "a record that dispenses with the tiresome business of verses and instead opts for songs apparently constructed by stitching eight different choruses together." BBC Music exclaimed that Girls Aloud "have resuscitated its corpse by wedding chart-friendly melodies to experimental avant-garde sounds". The album takes influences from a wide variety of sources, including "everything from French chanson to piano-pounding blues to the clipped R&B of the Small Faces". Rapping in the same vein as artists like Betty Boo and Neneh Cherry is prominent. Guitars are present for most of the album. Yahoo! Music says "there's nary a 'formula' in sight. There are as many sudden tonal and tempo switches as the tricksiest Chicago art rock band. And all but one song here gives guitars a starring role." The songs are noticeably less rooted in electronic music, although "Swinging London Town" is "a dark, squiggly synth pop epic" and "It's Magic" is composed of "little Röyksopp-like keyboard riffs".

The album was described as "a concept album which relates to the girls and what it's like to be a twentysomething girl in London". The Guardian said that the album's "lyrics sound like Blur's Parklife rewritten by the editorial staff of Heat magazine" and "holds a distinctly ambiguous mirror up to noughties celebrity." Girls Aloud came under fire for the album's allegedly "dirty lyrics". "I'm surprised that some of our lyrics have caused a stir. We're just having a laugh, and a lot of the songs are very tongue in cheek," commented Kimberley Walsh on the matter. Sarah Harding said that songs like "Racy Lacey", which "lampoons promiscuous females", are "observational rather than autobiographical." "Models" was also criticised for its use of the word "shit", while "Swinging London Town" allegedly "toys with the girls' reputation for partying a little too heartily." "Watch Me Go", co-written by former 'N Sync member JC Chasez, also "delves into the [...] topic of bondage." "It's Magic" is the only song on which Girls Aloud receive a writing credit.

Songs
The album opens with "Intro", a 42-second introduction, The end of "Intro" segues into the first full track on the album, "Models". The song "deals with men who try to assert their masculinity by sleeping with cover girls", but contains a "council estate girls made good" sub-text. It received comparisons to Duran Duran's "Girls on Film" (which Girls Aloud once covered) and Madonna's "Material Girl". One reviewer called "Biology" "the most faithful to this album's spirit of innovation, blending the kind of saucy cabaret you'd expect to find in a gin-soaked saloon bar with a glorious chorus of fizzing, gliding synths and deceptively breakneck beats." "Wild Horses", track four on the album, "features a mock choirgirl intro segueing into a breezy acoustic-rocker [...] like a harder St Etienne." It was also described as "a futuristic country & western club banger". The song is followed by "See the Day", a cover of the 1985 Dee C. Lee single which has been "given a glossy 21st century refurb". The version, described as "the obligatory Christmas ballad", was largely slated for its lack of creativity and similarities to their 2004 cover of The Pretenders' "I'll Stand By You" (although some critics preferred it).

"Watch Me Go" was described as "deliciously slutty" and includes rapping similar to Betty Boo and Neneh Cherry. The song's outro was compared to The Black Eyed Peas' "My Humps". It was described by The Observer as "Eighties Boney M funk-pop." "Waiting" was described as a highlight by The Sunday Times. "Whole Lotta History" was called a "lush ballad", and it received comparisons to the Spice Girls' ballads. "Whole Lotta History" has also received comparisons to All Saints' "Never Ever". "Long Hot Summer" was called "effervescent but relatively unexciting", as well as a "well-produced, upbeat pop tune, with a great hook in the chorus" by The Sentinel. The song, like "Watch Me Go", also includes Betty Boo-esque rapping.

"Swinging London Town" received critical praise. It was called "a dark, squiggly synth pop epic a la Pet Shop Boys on the diverse characters – from wannabes to trustafarians – found in the nation's capital", and that there "hasn't been a song since the Pet Shop Boys' 'West End Girls' that captures the ugly charms of London on a Friday night, but 'Swinging London Town' comes close." It was further described as "a collision of warp-speed funk guitar riffs and distorted Giorgio Moroder-style techno-disco that unexpectedly drops into wafting movie-soundtrack ambience." "It's Magic", a Nicola Roberts solo which was called "the album's hidden highlight", was labelled "weighty, sultry electro-pop [...] layered with beautifully enticing synth melodies." "No Regrets", sung solely by Nadine Coyle, is an electro-bossanova ballad. The album's closer, "Racy Lacey", is "a portrait song of a young lady in the style of Prince's "Darling Nikki" or Blur's "Tracy Jacks." The Guardian called it "a kind of nuclear-powered Euro novelty record."

Release
Chemistry was released in Ireland on 2 December 2005 and in the United Kingdom on the following Monday. In addition to the standard edition of the album, a limited edition with a bonus disc was also released. The bonus disc contains Christmas music, including covers and original songs produced by Xenomania under the moniker Randy Snaps. The songwriters also took on Christmas-related pseudonyms. In Australia and New Zealand, the album was released on 20 February 2006; however, it failed to generate much interest. Additionally, Chemistry and other Girls Aloud releases appeared on the US iTunes Store on 26 June 2007.

Singles
The album's first single was "Long Hot Summer", released in August 2005 as a "buzz" track to regenerate interest in the girls. The song was earmarked for release on the soundtrack of the 2005 film Herbie: Fully Loaded. The plans fell through, but the music video had taken inspiration from the movie's car theme and Girls Aloud portrayed mechanics. The song was not well-received by critics, and it became their first single to miss the top five. The follow-up "Biology" was critically acclaimed and saw Girls Aloud return to the top five. Peter Cashmore, writing for The Guardian, described "Biology" as "the best pop single of the last decade". In September 2006, the single followed in the footsteps of "No Good Advice" and "Wake Me Up" to become the winner of the Popjustice £20 Music Prize. Just four weeks after the release of "Biology", Girls Aloud released a cover of Dee C. Lee's "See the Day" in the race for Christmas number one. It became their lowest charting single at the time. The song won the Heart Award at the O2 Silver Clef Lunch, an annual awards honouring songwriting and performance in aid of Nordoff-Robbins Music Therapy. The final single was "Whole Lotta History", which became their twelfth consecutive single to chart within the top ten. The video, filmed in Paris, France, was their first to be set on location and outside of the United Kingdom. In Australia "Biology"  was released as the first single in early 2006 peaking within the top 30. However second single "The Show" flopped peaking within the top 75 resulting in the third intended single, I'll Stand By You to be cancelled despite promotion earlier that year with single "Biology".

Reception

Critical response

Chemistry received positive reviews from music critics. Talia Kraines of BBC Music decided that the album was "quirky, modern and dripping with attitude" and "holds no disappointments." Virgin Media gave the album five stars, saying it was "bursting [...] with invention, quirky lyrics, tongue-in-cheek sauciness and [...] appeals to grown-up pop fans and music critics as well as to the teenyboppers." Yahoo! Music concurred by declaring that Chemistry was "as devilish and quirky and downright uplifting as anything else released by anyone this year." The Guardian was extremely positive in its review, saying it "spends 45 minutes doing the last thing you expect it to." The New York Times referred to the album as "endlessly entertaining". In comparison to Girls Aloud's previous albums, Entertainment.ie referred to Chemistry as their "best offering yet [...] overflowing with pop hooks, sassy production and choruses just waiting to take up permanent residence in your head." The Daily Telegraph said that Girls Aloud have "simply got much, much better [...] albums will have to get better in order to survive. It's happened here. Judging by Chemistry, Girls Aloud's songwriters are now working as hard as the band are." MusicOMH said it "achieves the almost impossible in bettering its predecessor." Dom Passantino of Stylus Magazine said he did prefer What Will the Neighbours Say?, but gave Chemistry an A−.

The Sunday Times, on the other hand, only gave Chemistry two and a half stars out of five. AllMusic stated that Girls Aloud's fans were outgrowing them and "the cracks were beginning to show".

Chemistry appeared at number 13 on Stylus Magazines Top 50 Albums of 2005 and number 35 on Observer Music Monthly's top 100 albums of 2005 list. In 2008, Slant Magazine said that "Chemistry is probably still their crowning glory". In 2009, the album was included in MSN Music's 20 best albums of the decade.

Chart performance
Chemistry became Girls Aloud's first album to miss the top ten when it debuted at number 11 on the UK Albums Chart, selling 81,962 units. Despite peaking at a low position, the first week sales outsold the band's debut studio album, Sound of the Underground, which debuted at number 2 with 37,077 units sold. The album dropped out of the top 75 after just seven weeks, but spent three more weeks in the chart after the release of "Whole Lotta History". Chemistry sold enough to be certified platinum. Chemistry debuted at number 34 on the Irish Albums Chart, and peaked at number 31 four weeks later. However, the album was certified platinum in Ireland.

Track listing
All tracks were produced by Brian Higgins and Xenomania. Credits adapted from the liner notes of Chemistry.

Covers, samples and other appearances
"Biology" samples the main riff from The Animals' "Club A-Gogo".
"See the Day" was originally performed by Dee C. Lee.
"It's Magic" is sung entirely by Nicola Roberts and appears as a B-side to "See the Day".
"No Regrets" is sung entirely by Nadine Coyle.

Charts

Weekly charts

Year-end chart

Certifications

Release history

Other notes
"Singapore", a track recorded during the album sessions that was not picked for the final album was later released on The Sound of Girls Aloud: The Greatest Hits compilation limited edition bonus disc.
"On My Way To Satisfaction", a track recorded during the album sessions that was not picked for the final album was later released on the St. Trinian's soundtrack. Footage of Sarah recording the track was shown on Girls Aloud: Home Truths. The song is registered on ASCAP under the name "Red Raw".
"Black Jacks", a track that was eventually released on Girls Aloud's fourth album, Tangled Up, was originally recorded during the sessions of Chemistry.
"Models (Theme from Off the Record)" is a remix shorted version for Girls Aloud's television series titled "Off The Record" and appears on the second disc of Something Kinda Ooooh.
A music video for "Models" was produced for use in their 2013 and pays a homage to the Victoria's Secret Fashion Show, with the girls backstage wearing the trademark pink dressing gowns.

References

2005 albums
Albums produced by Xenomania
Concept albums
Girls Aloud albums
Polydor Records albums